John R. Evans Jr. is a United States Army lieutenant general who serves as the commanding general of United States Army North since September 9, 2021. He most recently served as the commanding general of the United States Army Cadet Command and Fort Knox from May 18, 2018 to August 3, 2021. Previously, he served as the commanding General of the United States Army Special Operations Aviation Command from July 2016 to May 2018.

Evans is a 1988 graduate of Appalachian State University with a Bachelor of Science degree in criminal justice. He completed flight training to become an army aviator in 1990. Evans later earned a Master of Arts degree in adult education from Kansas State University and a second Master of Arts degree in national security and strategic studies from the Naval War College.

References

Year of birth missing (living people)
Living people
Place of birth missing (living people)
Appalachian State University alumni
American Master Army Aviators
Recipients of the Air Medal
Kansas State University alumni
Naval War College alumni
Recipients of the Meritorious Service Medal (United States)
Recipients of the Legion of Merit
United States Army generals
Recipients of the Defense Superior Service Medal
Recipients of the Distinguished Service Medal (US Army)